Point class may refer to 
Pointclass sets in mathematics
Point-class sealift ship
Point-class cutter